WHL may refer to:

Western Hockey League (1925–26), final iteration of the Western Canada Hockey League major pro ice hockey league
Western Hockey League (founded 1966 as CMJHL), a major junior ice hockey league based in Western Canada and the Northwestern United States
Western Hockey League (1952–1974), minor pro ice hockey league
West of Harvey Lock, measurement of distance along the Gulf Intracoastal Waterway
Women's Hockey League (founded 2015), official name of the Zhenskaya Hockey League, a professional ice hockey league in Eurasia

See also

 WHA (disambiguation)